Les Tuche 3, also known as The Magic Tuche, is a 2018 French comedy film co-written by Olivier Baroux, Nessim Chikhaoui, Julien Hervé, Philippe Mechelen and Jean-Paul Rouve and directed by Olivier Baroux. It is a sequel of Les Tuche and Les Tuche 2: Le Rêve américain. It was released in January 2018 and was a commercial success.

Synopsis
Jeff Tuche (played by Jean-Paul Rouve) is initially delighted with the news that the new TGV is passing near his village Bouzolles, but then discovers to his horror that the TGV will not have a stop in  Bouzolles. He pleads with the French President of the Republic to reconsider the itinerary of the new TGV so that his village doesn't remain in isolation from the world. But not hearing from the Élysée, he decides to run for the French presidential election and succeeds becoming the French President, leaving him with the daunting task of how to govern France.

Cast
 Jean-Paul Rouve as Jeff Tuche
 Isabelle Nanty as Cathy Tuche
 Claire Nadeau as Mamie Suze
 Sarah Stern as Stéphanie Tuche
 Pierre Lottin as Wilfried Tuche
 Théo Fernandez as Donald Tuche
 Marc Duret as Laurent Dupuis

References

External links
 

2018 comedy films
2010s French-language films
French comedy films